Nea Kallindoia is a community of the Lagkadas municipality. Before the 2011 local government reform it was part of the municipality of Kallindoia, of which it was a municipal district. The 2011 census recorded 563 inhabitants in the community. The community of Nea Kallindoia covers an area of 29.418 km2.

Administrative division
The community of Nea Kallindoia consists of two separate settlements: 
Kalamoto (population 501)
Mesokomo (population 62)
The aforementioned population figures are as of 2011.

See also
List of settlements in the Thessaloniki regional unit

References

Populated places in Thessaloniki (regional unit)